Xeraco formerly also named as "Jaraco" (in Castillian language) is a municipality in the comarca of Safor in Valencia, Spain. Like many coastal towns it is divided into the original village of Xeraco and the new beach resort, Xeraco Platja. Xeraco is separated from the neighbouring beach resorts of Gandia and Tavernes by the Riu Vaca and swamp land containing  native population of birds. It is an essentially agricultural village.

Geography
Xeraco is 57 km to the south from Valencia city (39° 01' 55" N 0° 12' 56" W). There is about 3 km between the village and the beach known as Xeraco Platja

Road: N-332.

Highway: AP-7 exit, shared with Xeresa

Railway station: C-1 Line, from Valencia (RENFE).

Demographics

Twin town
  Bruguières, France

References

Municipalities in the Province of Valencia
Safor